Poulaphouca Reservoir, officially Pollaphuca, is an active reservoir (for both water supply and electricity generation) and area of wild bird conservation in west County Wicklow, Ireland named after the Poulaphouca waterfall on its south-western end where the water exits the lake. The lake is also commonly known as the Blessington Lakes, even though there is just one.

It holds 166 billion litres (43.8 billion gallons, or 0.2 cubic km) and has a surface area 22.26 km2, making it the largest artificial reservoir in Ireland by capacity and surface area.  It has a 44.3 km (27.5-mile) shoreline, and is 39.6 km (24.6 miles) from the sea.

History

It was created between 1937 and 1947, with flooding beginning at 10:00 on 3 March 1940 by damming the River Liffey at Poulaphouca as part of the Electricity Supply Board project to build a second hydroelectric station in Ireland, Ardnacrusha on the River Shannon being the first.

The reservoir is one of two major sources of Dublin's water supply, the other major supply being Vartry Reservoir in east Wicklow.

Between 1938 and 1940, 76 houses were demolished, and the bridges at Humphreystown, Baltyboys, and Burgage blown up, in anticipation of the flooding of the valley for the Poulaphouca hydroelectric power station.

Technique
The Poulaphouca Reservoir supplies the three power stations along the River Liffey, which are located in Poulaphouca, Golden Falls and Leixlip. Poulaphouca has the largest capacity with two 15 MW generators driven by Kaplan turbines, the other two stations have a capacity of 4 MW each, so the total capacity of the power stations on the River Liffey is 38 MW.

The Kaplan turbines of the Poulaphouca station were delivered by the Swiss manufacturer Ateliers des Charmilles from Geneva, Switzerland. Each turbine has a capacity of 25,300 horsepower at a hydraulic head of 50.5 m. The contract was executed in collaboration with English Electric from London.

Nature

The reservoir is sometimes known as "lakes" due to its shape, which arises because it lies in not one but two river valleys - that of the Liffey and, primarily, that of the King's River.  The King's River joined the Liffey at Baltiboys, at which point it was the larger flow, and when the Liffey was dammed upstream of the confluence, the King's River Valley was flooded far to the south.

A ridge of land, on which the village of Valleymount lies, divides the southern part of the reservoir.

The goosander, recently arrived as a breeding species in Ireland, can sometimes be seen here.

Blessington Greenway 
The Blessington Greenway walk is 6.5 km in length and links the historic town of Blessington with the Palladian mansion at Russborough House. The trail starts in Blessington village and leads south to the Avon Ri Activity Centre at the southern end of the town and weaves its way along the lake shores and forestry, crosses an ancient medieval Ringfort, and then uses the footpath along part of the N81 before turning back into the forest at Burgage Moyle lane. The Greenway follows the lakeshore and phase 2 is underway, with the goal of a 30 km greenway around the reservoir for walking, cycling and other recreational activities.

See also

 Ardnacrusha power plant
 Carnsore Point
 Electricity Supply Board

References

Hydroelectric power stations in the Republic of Ireland
Buildings and structures in County Wicklow
Reservoirs in the Republic of Ireland